Osteophloeum is a genus of plant in family Myristicaceae. It contains a single tree species, Osteophloeum platyspermum native to Panama and South America.

References

External links
 

Myristicaceae genera
Monotypic magnoliid genera
Trees of Panama
Trees of Peru